Denys James Watkins-Pitchford MBE (25 July 1905 – 8 September 1990) was a British naturalist, an illustrator, art teacher and a children's author under the pseudonym "BB". He won the 1942 Carnegie Medal for British children's books.

Early life
Denys Watkins-Pitchford was born in Lamport, Northamptonshire, the second son of the Revd. Walter Watkins-Pitchford and his wife, Edith. His elder brother, Engel, died at the age of thirteen. Denys was himself considered to be delicate as a child, and because of this was educated at home, while his younger twin, Roger, was sent away to school. He spent a great deal of time on his own, wandering through the fields, and developed a love of the outdoors, which was to influence his writing. He enjoyed shooting, fishing and drawing; all these things were to influence his writing greatly. At the age of fifteen, he left home and went to study at the Northampton School of Art. He won several prizes while there, but was irked by the dry, academic approach, and longed to be able to draw from life.

While at the Northampton School of Art, Watkins-Pitchford won a travelling scholarship to Paris. He was later to say that he could not remember how long he had spent in Paris, but Quinn suggests that it was probably about three months. He worked at a studio in Montparnasse, and attended drawing classes. It is unknown exactly where he studied. In the autumn of 1924, he entered the Royal College of Art in London. In 1930 he became an assistant art master at Rugby School where he remained for seventeen years. While at Rugby School he began contributing regularly to the Shooting Times and started his careers as an author and an illustrator. He wrote under the pen name of '"BB"', a name based on the size of lead shot he used to shoot geese, but he maintained the use of his real name as that of the illustrator in all his books. He later illustrated books by other writers, and sold his own paintings locally.

Later years

Watkins-Pitchford married in 1939, and had two children, Robin, who died at the age of seven from Bright's Disease, and Angela. Tragedy entered his life a second time in 1974, when his wife, Cecily, became unwell after working in the garden while a farmer was spraying his fields at the other side of the hedge. She died a few weeks later. By the late 1980s, Watkins-Pitchford needed regular dialysis treatment. He was awarded an honorary MA by Leicester University in 1986, and was made a Member of the Order of the British Empire (MBE) in 1990. He collapsed suddenly in September of that year, and died while under anaesthetic in the operating theatre.

Works

For The Little Grey Men, published by Eyre & Spottiswoode in 1942, BB won the annual Carnegie Medal from the Library Association, recognising the year's best children's book by a British subject.

(1922) Diary & Sketchbook (Published in 2012)
(1937) The Sportsman's  Bedside Book
(1938) Wild Lone: The Story of a Pytchley Fox
(1939) Manka, the Sky Gypsy: The Story of a Wild Goose
(1941) The Countryman's Bedside Book
(1942) The Little Grey Men
(1943) The Idle Countryman
(1944) Narrow Boat 
(1944) Brendon Chase
(1945) The Fisherman's Bedside Book
(1945) The Wayfaring Tree
(1948) Meeting Hill
(1948) The Shooting Man's Bedside Book
(1948) A Stream in Your Garden
(1948) Down the Bright Stream (sequel to The Little Grey Men (1942), later released as The Little Grey Men Go Down the Bright Stream)
(1949) Be Quiet and Go A-Angling (Pseudonym Michael Traherne)
(1950) Confessions of a Carp Fisher
(1950) Letters from Compton Deverell
(1950) Tide's Ending
(1952) The Wind in the Wood
(1953) Dark Estuary
(1955) The Forest of Boland Light Railway
(1957) Alexander
(1957) Ben the Bullfinch
(1957) Wandering Wind 
(1957) Monty Woodpig's Caravan
(1958) Monty Woodpig & his Bubblebuzz Car
(1958) Mr Bumstead
(1958) A Carp Water (Wood Pool): And How to Fish It
(1959) The Wizard of Boland 
(1959) Bill Badger's Winter Cruise
(1959) Autumn Road to the Isles
(1960) Bill Badger and the Pirates
(1961) Bill Badger and the Secret Weapon 
(1961) The White Road Westwards 
(1961) The Badgers of Bearshanks 
(1961) Bill Badger's Finest Hour
(1962) Bill Badger's Whispering Reeds Adventure 
(1962) September Road to Caithness
(1962) Lepus the Brown Hare
(1963) Bill Badger's Big Mistake
(1964) The Pegasus Book of the Countryside
(1964) Summer Road to Wales 
(1967) Bill Badger and the Big Store Robbery
(1967) A Summer on the Nene
(1967) The Whopper
(1968) At the Back o' Ben Dee
(1969) Bill Badger's Voyage to the Worlds End
(1971) The Tiger Tray
(1975) The Pool of the Black Witch
(1975) Lord of the Forest
(1976) Recollections of a Longshore Gunner
(1978) A Child Alone
(1979) Ramblings of a Sportsman-Naturalist 
(1980) The Naturalist's Bedside Book
(1981) The Quiet Fields
(1984) Indian Summer
(1985) The Best of BB
(1987) Fisherman's Folly
(1990) The Confessions of a Coastal Gunner (published in 2011)

Further reading

BB - A Celebration Edited by Tom Quinn (Wharncliffe Publishing Ltd)
BB - A Symposium  Compiled and edited by Bryan Holden (Roseworld Productions Ltd)
BB's Birds by Bryan Holden (Roseworld Productions Ltd)
Letters From the Roundhouse compiled by Gordon Wright (Roseworld Productions Ltd)
Faxton - The Lost Village by Bryan Holden (Roseworld Productions Ltd)
BB Remembered: the Life and Times of Denys Watkins-Pitchford, Tom Quinn, Swan Hill Press 2006

Motto

Inside all his books appeared the quotation:
The wonder of the world
The beauty and the power,
The shapes of things,
Their colours, lights and shades,
These I saw.
Look ye also while life lasts.

This quote, so apt for his works, has sometimes been thought to have been another one of 'BB'’s creations but it was in fact copied from a tombstone in a north-country churchyard by his father.

Adaptations of his works

In 1975 The Little Grey Men was adapted into a 10-part animated series called Baldmoney, Sneezewort, Dodder and Cloudberry by Anglia Television in the U.K.  Brendon Chase was dramatised into a 13-part series by Southern Television in 1980.

In 1970, the Swiss public TV station SRG SSR adapted Bill Badger and the Pirates into an 18 part marionette children's program entitled Dominik Dachs und die Katzenpiraten, in Swiss-German dialect. It was rebroadcast in March 2012.

Trivia

The Little Grey Men was one of Syd Barrett's favourite books; an excerpt from it was read at his funeral.

References

External links 
 
 The BB Society
 BB or Denys Watkins-Pitchford biography at Stella & Rose's Books
 Model train gallery at Countryside Models — based on The Forest of Boland Light Railway
  (includes work published as by BB or B. B.)
 Michael Traherne at LC Authorities, 1 record (another pseudonym)

English children's writers
English fantasy writers
British children's book illustrators
Carnegie Medal in Literature winners
Members of the Order of the British Empire
Writers who illustrated their own writing
People from West Northamptonshire District
1905 births
1990 deaths
Place of death missing
20th-century English novelists